Bolar is an unincorporated community in Bath County and Highland County, Virginia, United States. Bolar is situated along Bolar Run on Big Valley Road, which roughly follows the county line through the community.

References

Unincorporated communities in Bath County, Virginia
Unincorporated communities in Highland County, Virginia
Unincorporated communities in Virginia